Enrique Píoquinto Soto Villanueva (15 July 1915 – 5 June 1982) was a Mexican basketball player. He competed in the men's tournament at the 1952 Summer Olympics.

References

External links
 

1915 births
1982 deaths
Mexican men's basketball players
Olympic basketball players of Mexico
Basketball players at the 1952 Summer Olympics
Place of birth missing